The Rock Records Co., Ltd. commonly known as Rock Records, is a record label based in Taipei, Taiwan. Founded in the 1980s as the Rock Music Publishing (滾石有聲出版社) by Tuan Chung-tan and Tuan Chung-i, It is the largest record label in Chinese-speaking world and the second largest independent record label in Asia.

Beside its headquarters in Taiwan, it also has locations in Japan, Singapore, Malaysia (acquired SCS in 1995 (Suara Cipta Sempurna, founded in the 1980s), South Korea and the Philippines.

Distributors
 Avex Group (Japan, former)
 Nippon Crown (Japan, former) (until 1997)
 Pony Canyon (Japan and South Korea)
 Synergy Music / Ivory Music (Philippines)
 Star Records (Philippines, former) (1997-????)

Artists

Singers
 Wakin Chau (周華健)
 Yorick Lau (刘洋)
 Gary Chaw (曹格)
 Ambrose Hui (許紹洋)
 MC HotDog 
 Chang Chen-yue (張震嶽)
 Nine Chen (陳零九)
 Shi Shi (孫盛希)
 MJ116

Groups
 Astro Bunny
 New Formosa Band
 Nine One One
 Tomahawk
 Tuesdays

Pianist
 Sandra Wright Shen

Former artists 
 Beyond
 Winnie Hsin (辛曉琪)
 Jackie Chan (成龍)
 Ah Niu (陳慶祥/阿牛)
 Jeff Chang (張信哲)
 Sarah Chen (陳淑樺)
 Tarcy Su (蘇慧倫)
 Leslie Cheung (張國榮)
 Victor Huang (黃品冠)
 Anita Mui (梅艷芳)
 Chyi Yu (齊豫)
 Yu Heng (宇恆)
 Grasshopper (草蜢)
 Yuki Hsu (徐懷鈺)
 Tracy Huang (黃鶯鶯)
 Sandy Lam (林憶蓮) 
 Guang Liang (王光良)
 Prudence Liew (劉美君)
 Rene Liu (劉若英)
 Lo Ta-yu (羅大佑)
 Karen Mok (莫文蔚)
 Mayday 
 Angelica Lee (李心潔)
 Fish Leong (梁静茹)
 One-Fang (萬芳)
 Richie Ren (任賢齊) 
 Cheer Chen (陳綺貞) 
 Shunza (順子)
 Tang Dynasty (唐朝樂隊)
 Black Panther (黑豹樂隊)
 Alex To (杜德偉)
 Wu Bai & China Blue
 Sasha Alexeev (薩沙 阿列克謝耶夫)
 As One (에즈원)
 Crash (크래쉬)
 Kelly Poon (潘嘉麗)
 Shorty Yuen (元若藍)
 Della Ding (丁噹)
 Yisa Yu (郁可唯)
 The Last Day of Summer 831

See also 
 List of record labels
 List of companies of Taiwan

References

External links
  

Taiwanese independent record labels
Record labels established in 1980
IFPI members
Companies based in Taipei